Renee Simons (born April 18, 1972 in Oliver, British Columbia as Renee Lemke) is a Canadian curler from Kelowna. She is the former lead of Team Kelly Scott and currently plays lead on Team Mary-Anne Arsenault.

Career
Playing lead for Kelly Scott, Simons won the 2006 Scott Tournament of Hearts, the 2007 Scotties Tournament of Hearts, a bronze medal at the 2006 Ford World Women's Curling Championship and a gold medal at the 2007 World Women's Curling Championship. She played lead for Scott from 2002 to 2009. The team also won two Grand Slam of Curling events and were the runner-ups at the 2005 Canadian Olympic Curling Trials to Shannon Kleibrink.

On March 3, 2020, it was announced she and former teammates Jeanna Schraeder and Sasha Carter would be skipped by five-time Scotties Champion Mary-Anne Arsenault for the 2020–21 season. The team played in one event during the abbreviated season, finishing runner-up at the Sunset Ranch Kelowna Double Cash to Team Corryn Brown. Due to the COVID-19 pandemic in British Columbia, the 2021 provincial championship was cancelled. As the reigning provincial champions, Team Brown was invited to represent British Columbia at the 2021 Scotties Tournament of Hearts, which they accepted, ending the season for Team Arsenault.

The next season, the team again reached the final of the Sunset Ranch Kelowna Double Cash, losing to the Kaila Buchy junior rink. They were able to compete in their provincial championship at the 2022 British Columbia Scotties Tournament of Hearts in Kamloops from January 5 to 9. After losing to Team Kayla MacMillan in both the A Final and 1 vs. 2 page playoff game, Team Arsenault defeated MacMillan 8–6 in the final to win the provincial championship. At the 2022 Scotties Tournament of Hearts, the team finished with a 3–5 round robin record, defeating Quebec, the Northwest Territories and the Yukon in their three victories.

Prior to joining the Scott team, Simons had been to one other national championship. In 1991, she played third for Allison MacInnes at the Canadian Junior Curling Championships.

Personal life
She is married, and has two children. She is employed as a customer service manager and purchaser at ClearSolv Solvents Inc.

References

External links
 

Curlers from British Columbia
1972 births
Living people
People from Oliver, British Columbia
World curling champions
Canadian women curlers
Canadian women's curling champions
Continental Cup of Curling participants
Canada Cup (curling) participants
Sportspeople from Kelowna